The 2010–11 NBL season is the 34th season for the Wollongong Hawks in the NBL. After coming runners-up in the 2009–10 NBL season, the Hawks missed out on the finals for the second consecutive season.

Off-season

Additions

Subtractions

Current roster

Depth chart

Regular season

Standings

Game log

|- style="background-color:#ffcccc;"
| 1
| 9 October
| New Zealand
| L 82-98
| Larry Davidson (19) 
| Glen Saville (7)
| Rhys Martin (7)
| WIN Entertainment Centre  3,329
| 0–1
|- style="background-color:#bbffbb;"
| 2
| 16 October
| Adelaide
| W 97-89
| Oscar Forman,  Rhys Martin,  Mat Campbell (16)
| Oscar Forman (11)
| Rhys Martin (9)
| WIN Entertainment Centre  2,966
| 1–1
|- style="background-color:#ffcccc;"
| 3
| 21 October
| Gold Coast
| L 58-83
| Joevan Catron (13)
| Tim Coenraad (5)
| Rhys Martin &  Mat Campbell (2)
| WIN Entertainment Centre  
| 1–2
|- style="background-color:#ffcccc;"
| 4
| 23 October
| @ Sydney
| L 89-95
| Joevan Catron (23)
| Joevan Catron (8) 
| Rhys Martin (5)
| Sydney Entertainment Centre  
| 1–3
|- style="background-color:#bbffbb;"
| 5
| 28 October
| @ Cairns
| W 69-64
| Tim Coenraad (16)
| Joevan Catron (8)
| Rhys Martin (9)
| Cairns Convention Centre
| 2–3
|- style="background-color:#ffcccc;"
| 6
| 30 October
| Melbourne
| L 74-82
| Joevan Catron (18)
| Forman, Catron  Coenraad, Gruber (6)
| Showron Glover (6)
| WIN Entertainment Centre
| 2–4

|- style="background-color:#"
| 7
| 5 November
| @ Perth
| 
| 
| 
|
| Challenge Stadium 
| 
|- style="background-color:#"
| 8
| 11 November
| @ New Zealand
| 
| 
| 
|
| North Shore Events Centre 
| 
|- style="background-color:#"
| 9
| 20 November
| Perth
| 
| 
|
|
| WIN Entertainment Centre
|

|- style="background-color:#"
| 10
| 3 December
| @ Townsville
| 
| 
|
|
| Townsville Entertainment Centre 
| 
|- style="background-color:#"
| 11
| 11 December
| Perth
| 
| 
|
|
| WIN Entertainment Centre  
| 
|- style="background-color:#"
| 12
| 16 December
| @ Adelaide
| 
|
|
|
| Adelaide Arena  
| 
|- style="background-color:#"
| 13
| 31 December
| Sydney
|  
|
|
|
| WIN Entertainment Centre  
|

|- style="background-color:#"
| 14
| 7 January
| @ Townsville
|  
|
|
|
| Townsville Entertainment Centre  
|
|- style="background-color:#"
| 15
| 13 January
| Cairns
| 
| 
|
|
| WIN Entertainment Centre 
| 
|- style="background-color:#"
| 16
| 20 January
| @ Cairns
| 
| 
|
|
| Cairns Convention Centre  
| 
|- style="background-color:#"
| 17
| 21 January
| @ Townsville
|  
|
|
|
| Townsville Entertainment Centre  
| 
|- style="background-color:#"
| 18
| 27 January
| Melbourne
|  
|
|
|
| WIN Entertainment Centre
|

|- style="background-color:#"
| 19
| 4 February
| @ Gold Coast
| 
| 
|
|
| Gold Coast Convention and Exhibition Centre 
| 
|- style="background-color:#"
| 20
| 11 February
| New Zealand
|  
| 
|
|
| WIN Entertainment Centre
| 
|- style="background-color:#"
| 21
| 16 February
| @ New Zealand
| 
|
|
|
| North Shore Events Centre
|
|- style="background-color:#"
| 22
| 24 February
| Gold Coast
| 
|
|
|
| WIN Entertainment Centre
|
|- style="background-color:#"
| 23
| 26 February
| @ Gold Coast
|  
|
|
|
| Gold Coast Convention and Exhibition Centre 
|

|- style="background-color:#"
| 24
| 3 March
| @ Adelaide
| 
| 
|
|
| Adelaide Arena 
| 
|- style="background-color:#"
| 25
| 9 March
| Sydney
| 
|
|
|
| WIN Entertainment Centre
|
|- style="background-color:#"
| 26
| 18 March
| @ Melbourne
| 
|
|
|
| SNAHC
|
|- style="background-color:#"
| 27
| 24 March
| @ Sydney
| 
|
|
|
| Sydney Entertainment Centre
| 
|- style="background-color:#"
| 28
| 25 March
| Adelaide
| 
|
|
|
| WIN Entertainment Centre
|

Finals

Player statistics

Regular season

Finals

Awards

Player of the Week

Player of the Month

Coach of the Month

See also
2011-12 NBL season

References

External links
Official Site of the Hawks

Wollongong
Illawarra Hawks seasons

es:Wollongong Hawks
fr:Wollongong Hawks
it:Wollongong Hawks
ja:ウロンゴン・ホークス